PLAR may mean:
 Private line automatic ringdown, a telephony term
 Prior learning assessment and recognition, an educational term used mainly in Canada